Kansen Chu ( born October 27, 1952) is a Taiwanese-born American politician. A Democrat, Chu was a member of the California State Assembly from 2014 to 2020, for the 25th District, which encompasses parts of the South and East Bay regions of the San Francisco Bay Area.

In 2019, Chu announced that he would not seek reelection for State Assembly in 2020, instead running for the Santa Clara County Board of Supervisors. He lost to Otto Lee in the general election.

On February 10, 2021, Chu was appointed to the Berryessa Union School District Board of Trustees to fill a vacant seat. His current term ends in 2022.

Chu ran for the 24th Assembly district seat in the redrawn 2022 election, but was defeated in the primary by incumbent Alex Lee.

Early life 
In 1952, Chu was born in Taipei, Taiwan.

Education 
Chu earned a Bachelor of Science degree in Electrical Engineering from National Taipei University of Technology. Chu earned a master's degree in Electrical Engineering from California State University, Northridge.

Career 
In 1978, Chu became a microdiagnostics microprogrammer at IBM, where he worked for 18 years. In 1989, Chu became an owner of a Chinese restaurant, until 2007.

In 2002, Chu began his political career as a member of Berryessa Union School District board of education.

Prior to being elected to the Assembly in 2014, Chu was a San Jose City Councilman representing District 4. He is a member of the California Asian & Pacific Islander Legislative Caucus. He was the first Taiwanese-American elected to the San Jose City Council.

2000 Council
In 2000, Chu was defeated by Chuck Reed for the District 4 council seat.

In his first year on the council, Chu initiated landmark legislation to require citywide green building standards, ban the use of plastic bags, and mandate the installation of automatic heart defibrillators across San Jose.

2002 Berryessa Union School Board
In 2002, Chu was elected to the Berryessa Union School Board.  As a school board member, he championed stronger curricula, better education materials, and improved public access to school board meetings.

Chu has served on the Berryessa Union School Board for 5 years, Santa Clara Valley Metro YMCA, Vietnamese Voluntary Foundation, Shin Shin Education Foundation, and Advisory Board of Californians for Justice.  Kansen has also served on the Santa Clara County Mental Health Board, Private Industry Council under Job Training Partnership Act, Neighborhood Accountability Board of Berryessa, the KNTV Channel 11 Community Board, Asian Law Alliance, and many other advisory commissions and boards.   He continues to serve on the board of Vision New America, dedicated to advancing youth involvement in civics and government.

Departing the California Assembly 
On May 13, 2019, Chu announced that he would be a candidate for the Santa Clara County Board of Supervisors in 2020.  He will not be seeking reelection to the Assembly.

Election history

2014 California State Assembly

2016 California State Assembly

2018 California State Assembly

Personal life 
In 1976, Chu moved to the United States. 
Chu's wife is Daisy Chu. They have two children. Chu and his family live in San Jose, California.

References

External links 
 
 Campaign website
 Chu at smartvoter.org
 Kansen Chu at ballotpedia.org

Members of the California State Assembly
1952 births
Living people
Taiwanese emigrants to the United States
American politicians of Taiwanese descent
San Jose City Council members
California State University, Northridge alumni
21st-century American politicians
Asian-American city council members
California politicians of Chinese descent
National Taipei University of Technology alumni
Politicians from Taipei